Martín Luis Galván Romo (born 14 February 1993) is a Mexican professional footballer who plays as a winger.

Club career
Galván was born in Acapulco, Guerrero. On 5 January 2008, he debuted in an official match in the InterLiga tournament as an 85th-minute substitute against Monterrey becoming the youngest professional player in Mexican football history at 14 years and 325 days of age. The match ended in a 1–0 win for Cruz Azul.

Galván made his debut in the league November 2008, coming on as a sub against Indios.

Cruz Azul Hidalgo
In the 2011/12 season, Galván transferred to Cruz Azul's affiliate team Cruz Azul Hidalgo. He made four appearances in Ascenso MX league, scoring two goals.

Galván rejoined Cruz Azul Hidalgo on loan in January 2013.

International career
Galván took part of the Mexico under-17 team. In the 2009 CONCACAF U17 Championship he scored 3 goals in 3 appearances. He scored his 4th goal in a match against Nigata and scored his 5th goal in a match against Japan in the tournament "International of soccer Nigata 2009." He missed the 2009 FIFA U-17 World Cup because he was reprimanded for indiscipline.

Galván has so far made 5 appearances for the under-20s, scoring 3 goals.

References

External links

1993 births
Living people
Sportspeople from Acapulco
Footballers from Guerrero
Mexican footballers
Association football forwards
Liga MX players
Ascenso MX players
Liga Premier de México players
Cruz Azul footballers
Cruz Azul Hidalgo footballers
Correcaminos UAT footballers
Atlante F.C. footballers
Atlético Reynosa footballers
Pioneros de Cancún footballers
FC Juárez footballers
Segunda División B players
Tercera División players
Mexico youth international footballers
Mexican expatriate footballers
Mexican expatriate sportspeople in Spain
Expatriate footballers in Spain
Mexico under-20 international footballers